Pearl Street Historic District may refer to:

Pearl Street Historic District (Burlington, Vermont)
Pearl Street Historic District (Brandon, Mississippi), listed on the National Register of Historic Places in Rankin County, Mississippi

See also
 Pearl Street Mall, Boulder, Colorado